Pazderna is a municipality and village in Frýdek-Místek District in the Moravian-Silesian Region of the Czech Republic. It has about 300 inhabitants.

Etymology
The word pazderna was a designation for the house where flax was drying and shives (in Czech pazdeří) was obtained. The village was probably founded around such a house.

Geography
It lies in the historical region of Cieszyn Silesia, in the western part of the Moravian-Silesian Foothills. The Pazderůvka brook flows across the municipality.

History
The first written mention of Pazderna is from 1573, when it was part of the Frýdek state country and had 14 homesteads. It was probably founded only a few years ago. It was then mentioned as Pazdierna in the document sealing the selling of Frýdek by Stanislav II Pavlovský, Bishop of Olomouc, to Bartholomew von Wrbno.

After World War I and fall of Austria-Hungary it became a part of Czechoslovakia. In March 1939 it became a part of Protectorate of Bohemia and Moravia. After World War II it was restored to Czechoslovakia.

Sights
The Chapel of Saint John of Nepomuk was built in 1871.

References

External links

 

Villages in Frýdek-Místek District
Cieszyn Silesia